Baptotropa is a genus of snout moths. It was described by George Hampson in 1918 and contains the species Baptotropa tricolorella. It is found in Assam, India.

References

Anerastiini
Monotypic moth genera
Moths of Asia
Pyralidae genera